Admiral Alain Oudot de Dainville (born 15 March 1947 in Marsat (Puy de Dôme)) is a French Navy officer. He was Chief of Staff of the French Navy from 2005 to 2008.

Career 
A former naval pilot, Oudot de Dainville was the commanding officer of the Clemenceau from 1993 to 1995.

Between 1995 and 1997, he directed the nuclear powered Charles de Gaulle aircraft carrier project. Since 1999,  he held general staff position. He served as Chief of Staff of the French Navy from 2005 to 2008.

Honours 
 Grand officier of the Légion d'Honneur
 Commander of the Ordre National du Mérite

External links 
 Biography on the site of the Ministry of Defence

1947 births
Living people
French Navy admirals
Chiefs of Staff of the French Navy
École Navale alumni
Grand Officiers of the Légion d'honneur
Recipients of the Cross for Military Valour
Commanders of the Ordre national du Mérite